Zemlianky is an urban-type settlement in Makiivka Municipality in Donetsk Raion of Donetsk Oblast in eastern Ukraine. Population:

Demographics
Native language as of the Ukrainian Census of 2001:
 Ukrainian 60.08%
 Russian 39.69%
 Belarusian, Bulgarian, Moldovan (Romanian) 0.05%

References

Urban-type settlements in Donetsk Raion